Passport to Paradise is a 1932 American pre-Code drama film directed by George B. Seitz and starring Jack Mulhall, Blanche Mehaffey and Eddie Phillips. It was produced as a second feature for release by the independent company Mayfair Pictures. The film is now considered to be lost.

Synopsis
As part of the terms's of his grandfather's will, Bob has to travel round the world with no money in order to claim his inheritance. He smuggles himself aboard a cruise ship where he is befriended by Elsa who he later discovers is an exiled princess.

Cast
 Jack Mulhall as Bob
 Blanche Mehaffey as Elsa
 Eddie Phillips as Gordon Battle
 William P. Burt as Amos Turkle
 Gloria Joy as Norma
 John Ince as Ship's Captain

References

Bibliography
 Pitts, Michael R. Poverty Row Studios, 1929–1940: An Illustrated History of 55 Independent Film Companies, with a Filmography for Each. McFarland & Company, 2005.

External links

1932 films
1932 drama films
American black-and-white films
American drama films
Films directed by George B. Seitz
Lost American films
Mayfair Pictures films
1930s English-language films
1930s American films